Crassispira pulchrepunctata is a species of sea snail, a marine gastropod mollusk in the family Pseudomelatomidae.

Description
The length of the shell varies between 14 mm and 20 mm.

Distribution
This marine species occurs off Aliguay Island, Dipolog, Mindanao, Philippines

References

 Stahlschmidt, P. & Bozzetti, L., 2007. - Description of a new turriform gastropod (Gastropoda: Turridae) from Aliguay Island (Philippines). Malacologia Mostra Mondiale 56: 10-12

External links
 

pulchrepunctata
Gastropods described in 2007